Nikolay Milev (born 18 November 1930) is a Bulgarian former gymnast. He competed in eight events at the 1952 Summer Olympics.

References

External links
  

1930 births
Possibly living people
Bulgarian male artistic gymnasts
Olympic gymnasts of Bulgaria
Gymnasts at the 1952 Summer Olympics
Place of birth missing (living people)